The Topatopa Mountains are a mountain range in Ventura County, California, north of Ojai, Santa Paula, and Fillmore. They are part of the Transverse Ranges of Southern California.

Etymology
A name for the mountains was first inscribed within the archives of Mission Basilica San Buenaventura in 1943, citing a nearby Chumash ranchería named "Si-toptopo". In 1945, American linguist and ethnologist John Peabody Harrington noted that "topa" is a Chumash word meaning "reed" or "rush".

Geography
The Topatopa Mountains lie in an east–west direction east of the Sierra Madre Mountains, and west of the Sierra Pelona Mountains. To the south lies the Santa Clara River Valley into which various creeks drain starting in the mountains into the Santa Clara River. Snow frequently falls on the high peaks during winter.

Hydrology
Several major tributaries of the Santa Clara River flow down from the Topatopa Mountains, the largest being Piru Creek and Sespe Creek.

Lake Piru is the only major reservoir located within the mountains.

Natural history
The Topatopa Mountains are within the southern Los Padres National Forest. The Sespe Wilderness Area, and the Sespe Condor Sanctuary, are primarily within the Topatopa Mountains and foothills. They are part of the home range of the endangered California condor.

The habitat is of the California montane chaparral and woodlands ecoregion. Sespe Creek flows through the range, creating Sespe Gorge, with Riparian habitats of willows and woodlands.

Highest peaks
 Cobblestone Mountain 6,738 ft (2,054 m)
 Hines Peak - 6,703 ft (2,043 m)
 Topatopa Bluff - 6,367 ft (1,941 m)
 Chief Peak - 5,560+ ft (1,695+ m)
 Santa Paula Peak - 4,957 ft (1,511 m)
 Nordhoff Peak - 4,485 ft (1,367 m)

Adjacent Transverse Ranges
 San Emigdio Mountains - to the north
 Pine Mountain Ridge - to the north and northwest
 Sulphur Mountains - northwest across the Ojai Valley
 Sierra Madre Mountains - to the west
 Santa Ynez Mountains - to the southwest
 Santa Susana Mountains - to the southeast
 Sierra Pelona - to the east
 Tehachapi Mountains - to the northeast

See also
Fishes of Sespe Creek, California
Piru Creek

References

 
Mountain ranges of Ventura County, California
Transverse Ranges
Los Padres National Forest
Fillmore, California
Ojai, California
Santa Paula, California
Mountain ranges of Southern California